Thomas Clayton (born April 26, 1984) is a former American football running back. He was drafted by the San Francisco 49ers in the sixth round of the 2007 NFL Draft. He last played college football at Kansas State.

He has also been a member of the Cleveland Browns, New England Patriots, Seattle Seahawks and Arizona Cardinals.

Early years
Clayton was born in Germany on April 26, 1984. Clayton grew up in the Washington DC metropolitan area where he attended Mount Vernon High School in Alexandria, Virginia, where he was a SuperPrep All-American running back. He was named to the USA Today All-USA team and was rated the eighth best running back nationally by Rivals.com and participated in U.S. Army All-American Bowl As a senior, he rushed for more than 2,000 yards.

College career
Clayton began his college football career at Florida State University as a true freshman in 2002, rushing for 45 yards on 13 attempts. Clayton made his final appearance as a Seminole, playing in the 2003 Sugar Bowl. Following the BCS Bowl, Clayton then transferred to Kansas State University, where he sat out the 2003 season under NCAA transfer rules. In 2004, Clayton appeared in 10 games serving as primary backup to Darren Sproles. He finishing with 14 carries for 71 yards. In 2005, with the departure of Darren Sproles to the NFL, Clayton's junior year looked to be promising. Picking up where Sproles left off, Clayton looked to be Kansas State's new bell cow, shredding opposing defenses for an average of 164.5 yards per game and 7.7 yards per rush. Leading the nation in both rushing yards per game, and yards per carry after week 3, Clayton was off to one of the best starts in school history, piling up 329 yards in the first two games. It was the most rushing yards in school history for the first two games of a season. He needed 221 yards to equal the best three-game start in school history and 70 yards for the second-best start, and against a feeble University of North Texas opponent coming week 4, Clayton would have had no problem accomplishing that had he not been suspended due to an arrest during the team's week 3 bye. "Thomas Clayton, the nation's leading rusher, was arrested Friday and charged with aggravated battery, stemming from a Sept. 16 altercation involving a university parking services employee." Obviously slowed down by this arrest, Clayton found himself in the dog house after such a promising start. Working himself back into good grace with the team, Clayton was able to finish the 2005 season with two strong games against Nebraska (85 yards) and Missouri (104 yards), allowing him to finish as the team's leading rusher with 637 yards and 5 total touchdowns. In 2006, Clayton entered the season ranked amongst the nation's top 10 returning senior running backs. However, with the retirement of head coach Bill Snyder, and the hiring of Ron Prince, Clayton was not able to match his 2005 success. With obvious friction between Clayton and Prince, Clayton only started 4 games his senior year, finishing the year with 338 rushing yards and 3 touchdowns before parting ways with the team after week 6, for undisclosed reasons. Clayton's best game in 2006 came in week 3 against Kansas State's highest ranked opponent, #5 Louisville Cardinals, where he rushed for 119 yards on 15 carries, one of which went 69 yards for a touchdown. He also hauled in five passes for 34 yards.

Though Clayton only participated in 4 games his senior season,  NFL scouts felt he displayed plenty of upside in his junior season to receive a 2007 NFL Combine invitation. Clayton also participated in the 2007 Senior Bowl. Clayton was a late addition to the 2007 Senior Bowl roster, but certainly made his presence felt upon his arrival to Mobile, Alabama. Clayton took advantage of his opportunity to display his ability in Mobile, immediately catching the eye of NFL scouts with his burst and quickness throughout the week of practice.

Professional career

San Francisco 49ers
Clayton was drafted by the San Francisco 49ers in the sixth round (186th overall) of the 2007 NFL Draft where he went on to lead the NFL in rushing during the 2007 preseason. He duplicated his preseason success in 2008, where he led all rushers again. In August 2009, Clayton suffered an ACL injury, and was placed on injured reserve, where he spent the entire season.

First stint with the Patriots
Clayton signed with the New England Patriots on June 11, 2010. He was waived on August 6, 2010, but re-signed on August 11, 2010. He was waived during final cuts on September 4, 2010.

First stint with the Browns
Clayton was signed to the Cleveland Browns' practice squad on September 14, 2010.

Second stint with the Patriots
The Patriots signed Clayton off the Browns' practice squad on September 30, 2010. He was waived on October 23, 2010.

Second stint with the Browns
Clayton was claimed off waivers by the Browns on October 25, 2010. He was waived on December 1, 2010. He was active for two games, registering 0 yards on one carry in a Week 10 loss to the New York Jets.

Third stint with the Patriots
The Patriots claimed Clayton off waivers on December 2, 2010. He played in one game for the Patriots, the Week 17 season finale against the Miami Dolphins, running six times for 17 yards. He was released on August 3, 2011.

Seattle Seahawks
Clayton was claimed off waivers by the Seattle Seahawks on August 3 and then released prior to the start of the season.

Third stint with the Browns
Clayton signed with the Browns on November 1, 2011, after Montario Hardesty tore his calf muscle.

Arizona Cardinals
Clayton signed with the Arizona Cardinals on July 31, 2012. He was waived/injured on August 24, 2012.

References

External links
Arizona Cardinals bio
Cleveland Browns bio
Seattle Seahawks bio
New England Patriots bio
San Francisco 49ers bio

1984 births
Living people
Sportspeople from Alexandria, Virginia
Players of American football from Virginia
American football running backs
Florida State Seminoles football players
Kansas State Wildcats football players
San Francisco 49ers players
New England Patriots players
Cleveland Browns players
Seattle Seahawks players
Arizona Cardinals players